Find Me Finding You is the fourth studio album from the French singer Lætitia Sadier, performing as the Lætitia Sadier Source Ensemble. It was released on 24 March 2017 under Drag City records.

Track listing

Personnel
Credits adapted from liner notes.

 Lætitia Sadier - voice, vocal arrangements , guitar , keys , percussion , drums , synths , Minimoog , effects  , mixing
 Homero Basilo - pandeiro , engineering 
 Matthieu Beck - choir 
 Alisia Casper - sleeve
 Joe Carvell - double bass 
 Chris A. Cummings - electric piano , drum machine  , backing vocals 
 Bo Kondren - mastering
 Julie Gasnier - choir , vocals 
 Mason Le Long - guitar , guitar lead 
 Vicente Machado - drums 
 Emma Mario - percussion , keys , steel drum , drums , bongos  Electronics , Animoog , vocals , keys , claps , vocal arrangements , synths , choir , mixing
 Martalina and the Finnish Au Pair choir, vocals 
 Rob Mazurek - coronet 
 Marcelo Machado Mendonça - guitar 
 Marie Merlet - choir 
 Phil M FU - electronics , keys , synths 
 Jose Missionario  - bass 
 Chiquinho Moreira - electronics , keys , effects 
 Xavi Munoz - bass , vocals and claps 
 Jeff Parker - vocal arrangements 
 Armelle Pioline - choir , vocals 
 Nina Savary - choir , vocals 
 Felipe Souza - voice and guitar 
 Alexis Taylor - voice 
 David Thayer - choir , organs , synths  pianoline and piano , cymbals  flute , keys , bass pedals 
 Joe Watson - choir , vocal arrangements , synth , keys and bass

References

External links
 

2017 albums
Drag City (record label) albums